Aslıhan is a Turkish female given name, derived from names Aslı and Han. It means 'from khan family' or shortly 'noble'.

Given name
Notable people with this name include:
K. Aslıhan Yener, archaeologist
Aslıhan Koruyan Sabancı, chef and cookery writer

Other uses
Aslıhan is also a place connected to the Altıeylül district of Balıkesir province, Turkey.

See also
 Aslı
 Neslihan

Turkish feminine given names